Tetrastigma leucostaphylum, the Indian chestnut vine, is a flowering plant in the family Vitaceae. It is native to Sri Lanka, India, Nepal and South East Asia.

Ecology

Relationship with Rafflesia
In Sumatra, Tetrastigma leucostaphylum serves as host for the world's largest flower, the parasitic plant Rafflesia arnoldii.

References

leucostaphylum
Flora of tropical Asia